Elections to Newport City Council were held on 3 May 2017 along with elections to the other 21 local authorities in Wales, community council elections in Wales and 2017 United Kingdom local elections.

Councillors elected in this election will serve a five-year term due to new Welsh Government policy.

The previous election took place on 3 May 2012.

The next full election will take place in May 2022.

Election results: overview

|-bgcolor=#F6F6F6
| colspan=2 style="text-align: right; margin-right: 1em" | Total
| style="text-align: right;" | 50
| colspan=5 |
| style="text-align: right;" |  43,991 
| style="text-align: right;" | 
|-
|}

Ward results
Asterisks denote incumbent ward councillors seeking re-election.

Allt-yr-yn

Alway

Beechwood

Bettws

Whitehead had been elected as an Independent in 2012. Cleverly had been elected as an Independent at a by-election in 2015.

Caerleon

Gaer

Graig

Langstone

Liswerry

Llanwern

Malpas

Marshfield

Pillgwenlly

Ali had been elected for Labour at a by-election in 2013.

Ringland

Rogerstone

Evans was elected for the Labour Party in 2012.

St Julians

Townsend had been elected at a by-election in July 2016.

Shaftesbury

Stow Hill

Tredegar Park

Victoria

By-elections

Graig

Victoria

References 

Newport
2017